A Small Town Idol is a 1921 American silent feature comedy film produced by Mack Sennett and released through Associated First National. The film stars Ben Turpin and was made and acted by many of the same Sennett personnel from his previous year's Down on the Farm. Sennett and Erle C. Kenton directed.

The picture was Sennett’s biggest undertaking to date, costing $350,000 and required over a year to make.

Plot
Sam (Turpin) leaves town after being falsely accused of a crime and becomes a film star in Hollywood working with actress Marcelle Mansfield (Prevost). He returns to his home town hailed as a hero where one of his films is shown in the theater. His rival Jones (Finlayson), who wants Sam's girlfriend Mary (Haver), frames Sam for the shooting of Mary's father. Just as the townspeople are about to lynch Sam, Mary arrives to prove Sam's innocence and the two are reconciled.

Cast
Ben Turpin as Sam Smith
James Finlayson as J. Wellington Jones
Phyllis Haver as Mary Brown
Bert Roach - Martin Brown
Al Cooke as Joe Barnum
Charles Murray as Sheriff Sparks (credited as Charlie Murray)
Marie Prevost as Marcelle Mansfield
Dot Farley as Mrs. Smith
Eddie Gribbon as Bandit Chief
Kalla Pasha as Bandie Chief's Rival
Billy Bevan as Director
George O'Hara as Cameraman
John J. Richardson as Screen Villain (credited as Jack Richardson)
Louise Fazenda as Theatregoer
Lige Conley as Minister (credited as Lige Crommie)

uncredited performers
Heinie Conklin as Jester in movie
Ramon Novarro as Dancer (credited as Ramon Samaniegos)
Jane Allen as Minor Role
Andy Clyde as Minor Role
Harry Gribbon as Minor Role
Floy Guinn as Minor Role
Mack L. Hamilton as Minor Role
Harriet Hammond as Minor Role
Mildred June as Minor Role
Fanny Kelly as Minor Role
Marvin Loback as Minor Role
Don Marion as Minor Role
Kewpie Morgan as Minor Role
Derelys Perdue as Dancer
Gladys Whitfield as Minor Role

Notes
 This was Ramon Novarro's seventh film, where he was billed as Ramon Samaniegos.
 Copies of the film exist in archives, such as Gosfilmofond.
 In 1939, Warner Bros. cut it down to two reels, adding music, sound effects and narration, and released it as a "Broadway Brevity."

References

External links

A Small Town Idol (1921) - abridged with narration at Internet Archive

1921 films
American silent feature films
First National Pictures films
American black-and-white films
Silent American comedy films
1921 comedy films
Films directed by Erle C. Kenton
Films directed by Mack Sennett
1920s American films